Seán Lester (28 September 1888 – 13 June 1959) was an Irish diplomat who was the last secretary-general of the League of Nations from 31 August 1940 to 18 April 1946.

Early life
He was born in County Antrim, the son of a Protestant grocer. Although the town of Carrickfergus, where he was born and raised, was strongly Unionist, he joined the Gaelic League as a youth and was won over to the cause of Irish nationalism. As a young man, he joined the Irish Republican Brotherhood. He worked as a journalist for the North Down Herald and a number of other northern papers before he moved to Dublin, where he found a job at the Freeman's Journal. By 1919, he had risen to its news editor.

After the Irish War of Independence, a number of his friends joined the new government of the Irish Free State. Lester was offered and accepted the position as director of publicity.

He married Elizabeth Ruth Tyrrell in 1920 by whom he had three daughters.

Diplomatic career
In 1923, he joined Ireland's Department of External Affairs. He was sent to Geneva in 1929 to replace Michael MacWhite as Ireland's Permanent Delegate to the League of Nations. In 1930, he succeeded in organising Ireland's election to the Council (or executive body) of the League of Nations for a three years. Lester often represented Ireland at Council meetings and stood in for the Minister for External Affairs. He became increasingly involved in the work of the League, particularly in its attempts to bring a resolution to two wars in South America. His work brought him to the attention of the League Secretariat and began his transformation from national to international civil servant.

When Peru and Colombia had a dispute over a town in the headwaters of the Amazon, Lester presided over the committee that found an equitable solution. He also presided over the less-successful committee when Bolivia and Paraguay went to war over the Gran Chaco.

In 1933, Lester was seconded to the League's Secretariat and sent to Danzig (now Gdańsk, Poland), as the League of Nations' High Commissioner from 1934 to 1937. The Free City of Danzig was the scene of an emerging international crisis between Nazi Germany and the international community over the issue of the Polish Corridor and the Free City's relationship with the Third Reich. Lester repeatedly protested to the German government over its persecution and discrimination of Jews and warned the League of the looming disaster for Europe. He was boycotted by the representatives of the German Reich and the representatives of the Nazi Party in Danzig.

In August 2010, a room in the Gdansk City Hall, the building that had been Lester's residence during his stay, was renamed by Mayor Paweł Adamowicz as the Seán Lester Room.

League of Nations
Lester returned to Geneva in 1937 to become Deputy Secretary General of the League of Nations. In 1940, he became Secretary General of the body, but the League now had only 100 employees, including guards and janitors, of the original 700.

Lester remained in Geneva throughout the war and kept the League's technical and humanitarian programs in limited operation for the duration of the war. In 1946, he oversaw the League's closure and turned over the League's assets and functions to the newly-established United Nations.

Later years
Despite rumours that he would be prepared to stand for election as President of Ireland, Lester sought no permanent office and retired to Recess, County Galway, in the west of Ireland, where he died.

In its obituary, The Times described Lester as an "international conciliator and courageous friend of refugees". He was given the Woodrow Wilson Award in 1945 and a doctorate of the National University of Ireland in 1948.

His granddaughter Susan Denham was Chief Justice of Ireland for the Supreme Court of Ireland from 2011 to 2017.

References

Biographies
Stephen Ashworth Barcroft: The international civil servant: the League of Nations career of Sean Lester, 1929–1947; Dublin 1973
Douglas Gageby: The last secretary general: Sean Lester and the League of Nations; Dublin 1999; 
Arthur W. Rovine: The first fifty years: the secretary-general in world politics 1920–1970; Leyden 1970; 
Michael Kennedy: Ireland and the League of Nations 1919–1946: politics, diplomacy and international relations; Dublin 1996
Paul McNamara: Sean Lester, Poland and the Nazi Takeover of Danzig; Irish Academic Press Ltd 2008;

External links
Biography
Nation Builders: Sean Lester biographical article from the producers of an Irish documentary on Lester.
League of Nations Archives, with a short biography
League of Nations Archives, Private Archives of Sean Lester
Documents on Irish Foreign Policy website
 

1880s births
1959 deaths
Irish diplomats
Irish Protestants
Secretaries General of the League of Nations
People from Carrickfergus
People educated at Methodist College Belfast